Albe may refer to:
Albé, a commune in France
Albe (river), a tributary of the Saar in northeastern France
Massa d'Albe, a comune in Italy
Albe (Massa d'Albe), a frazione in Italy
Elbling, a grape variety also known as Albe

People with the surname
Alicia Albe (born 1977), American rhythmic gymnast

See also
Alba (disambiguation)